Coccinella transversoguttata, the transverse ladybird, is a species of ladybird beetle occurring across Europe and North America. It is not to be confused with another species by the same common name, Coccinella transversalis, a widespread species across Australia and Asia.

References

External links
 Bugguide.net

Coccinellidae
Beetles of Europe
Beetles of North America
Insects of Sri Lanka
Beetles described in 1835